An agalma is a cult image or votive offering.

Agalma may also refer to:

Agalma (siphonophore), a marine animal genus in the family Agalmatidae
Agalma, a synonym of the flowering plant genus Heptapleurum
Agalma (journal) (est. 2000), an academic journal devoted to the study of culture and aesthetics

See also
Alma (disambiguation)
Alms, charity given to the poor; a false cognate of the word agalma
Amalgam (disambiguation)